Étoile Filante du Togo is a professional Togolese football club based in Lomé.  Their home stadium is Stade Oscar Anthony. The club name translates as "Shooting Star of Lomé" and are known locally as "The Meteors".

Étoile Filante has won the national league championship seven times and were defeated finalists in the 1968 African Cup of Champions Clubs.

On 26 November 2011, some of the team's players were killed or injured in a bus crash near the Togolese city of Atakpame whilst travelling to a match.

History

The club was founded in 1932 under the name of Étoile Filante de Lomé. In 1974 and as part of the sports reform, the club is dissolved by the Togolese Football Federation and merged with Modèle de Lomé and Dynamic Togolais to form the club Lomé I which was later called Déma Club de Lomé. In 1978, Déma Club was dissolved as part of the second sport reform. In the 1990s, the club Étoile Filante is reformed and wins the championship in 1992.

Honours
Togolese Championnat National: 7
1961, 1962, 1964, 1965, 1967, 1968, 1992

Coupe du Togo: 4
1956, 1958, 1961, 1994
Finalists: 1996

African Champions League: 0
Finalists: 1968

French West African Cup: 1
1960

Performance in CAF competitions
African Cup of Champions Clubs: 3 appearances
1966: First Round
1968: Finalist
1969: Quarter-Finals
1993: Preliminary Round

CAF Cup: 2 appearances
1996 – First Round
1998 – First Round

CAF Cup Winners' Cup: 1 appearance
1995 – First Round

Current squad

Presidents (1933–60)
 Victor Atakpmey (1933–34)
 Philipe Nasr (1934–43)
 Ernest Sogodzo Kebey (1943–50)
 Stanislas Segbeaya (1950–51)
 Nicolas Djondjo (1952–55)
 Joseph Firmin Abalo (1958–60)

References

External links
Official website

Football clubs in Togo
Football clubs in Lomé
Association football clubs established in 1932
1932 establishments in French Togoland